Rhondda is a constituency represented in the House of Commons of the UK Parliament since 2001 by Chris Bryant of the Labour Party.

Boundaries

1974–1983: The Municipal Borough of Rhondda.

1983–2010: The Borough of Rhondda.

2010–present: The Rhondda Cynon Taff County Borough electoral divisions of Cwm Clydach, Cymmer, Ferndale, Llwyn-y-pia, Maerdy, Pentre, Pen-y-graig, Porth, Tonypandy, Trealaw, Treherbert, Treorchy, Tylorstown, Ynyshir, and Ystrad.

The Westminster constituency of Rhondda is based around the southern edge of the Rhondda Cynon Taf council area, with population centres including Treherbert, Maerdy, Tylorstown, Tonypandy, and Pen-y-Graig. The seat borders the constituencies of Cynon Valley, Ogmore, Pontypridd, and Aberavon.

History
This constituency was first created under the Redistribution of Seats Act 1885, for the 1885 general election. For the 1918 general election it was divided into Rhondda East and Rhondda West.

The constituency was reunited in 1974.  Since 1974, the constituency has always had a large Labour majority, and in the 1987 general election was the safest seat for any party, anywhere in Britain. In 2001, it was the only seat in the country where Liberal Democrats lost their deposit, and the Conservative Party also lost their deposit in their worst performance outside Northern Ireland.

Early History: the 1885 general election
The constituency was formed following the Third Reform Act of 1884, as a result of the rapid growth of population in the two valleys over the previous twenty years. During the 1880s the demand for working men representatives in the ranks of the Parliamentary Liberal Party were increasingly vociferous and there was a precedent for a Liberal-Labour (Lib-Lab) candidate in South Wales as Thomas Halliday had contested Merthyr Tydfil in 1874.

The local trade union, the Rhondda Steam Coal Miners' Association, laid claim to the candidacy as early as 1883, on the basis that the franchise had been extended to many working men within the county constituencies and that in Mabon, their agent for six years they had the ideal candidate. The local Liberal Association, however, formed in early 1885,was dominated by middle-class business and professional men, and included a disproportionate number of colliery officials. . Lewis Davis of Ferndale, brother of David Davis, Maesyffynnon, one of the leading coalowners in the valley, was selected as president of the association. Ministers, including William Morris of Noddfa, Treorchy were also prominent. At a meeting in April 1885 six names were put forward as possible candidates for the nomination, including Lewis Davis, Mabon and Alfred Thomas, a leading figure in the municipal life of Cardiff. Shortly afterwards, Lewis Davis was invited by the Association to be its parliamentary candidate and defeated Mabon in a ballot by 143 votes to 51. In spite of his selection, however, he declined and proposed that his son, the 22-year-old Frederick Lewis Davis, be the candidate. In a further ballot, F.L. Davis again defeated Mabon by 125 votes to 56.

The refusal of the trade union movement to accept this decision and to support an independent campaign by Mabon is regarded as an important watershed in the political history of South Wales. In terms of policy there was little apparent difference between the candidates, with the only notable difference being that Mabon supported the payment of MPs while Davis did not. The campaign was therefore waged on other grounds. Davis's supporters claimed that Mabon lacked legitimacy, having been rejected by the Liberal Association. Mabon's adherents, in turn, claimed that the miners' had held mass meetings throughout the two valleys to promote his candidature long before the middle-class-dominated Association was established. Davis's youth and inexperience was a major issue, although he had qualified as a barrister. There were also claims of intimidation on both sides. Mabon's supporters were said to be victimised at the workplace while several of Davis's meetings were disrupted by violence.

Class therefore became a major issue in the campaign. The vast majority of Mabon' supporters were trade union activists and working men, along with a relatively small number of tradesmen and professionals, some of whom had links of one form or another to the miners' union. These included Walter H. Morgan of Pontypridd, often described as the miners' lawyer. One nonconformist minister, supported Mabon, namely John Salisbury Edwards of Treorchy. In contest, Davis had the support of the vast majority of the middle-classes in the Rhondda, and natural deference together with the paternalistic influence of the Davis family, in the Rhondda Fach in particular, was a factor.

On polling day, Mabon scored a clear and decisive victory.
   

Despite the fierce contest the two wings of the Liberal Party in the Rhondda were soon reconciled. After the result, the Davis family accepted Mabon's victory and he was not challenged thereafter for the parliamentary seat. Following the election, Mabon's supporters established the Rhondda Labour and Liberal Association which shortly afterwards absorbed the rival Liberal Association which had supported Davis. Mabon was returned unopposed the following year.

Members of Parliament

1885–1918

1974–present

Elections

Elections 1885–1910

Elections in the 1880s

Elections in the 1890s

Elections in the 1900s

Elections in the 1910s

Elections 1974–present

Elections in the 1970s

Elections in the 1980s

Elections in the 1990s

Elections in the 2000s

Elections in the 2010s

Of the 56 rejected ballots:
34 were either unmarked or it was uncertain who the vote was for.
22 voted for more than one candidate.

The seat saw the fewest Conservative votes on mainland Great Britain in 2017, 22 fewer than in Manchester Gorton; likewise as to the Liberal Democrat votes, 18 votes fewer than in Blaenau Gwent.

See also
 Rhondda (Senedd constituency)
 List of parliamentary constituencies in Mid Glamorgan
 List of parliamentary constituencies in Wales
 A map of Glamorganshire in 1885, showing its new divisions.

Notes

References

Bibliography

External links
Election result, 2005 (BBC)
Election results, 1997 – 2001 (BBC)
Election results, 1997 – 2001  (Election Demon)
Election results, 1983 – 1992 (Election Demon)
Election results, 1992 – 2005 (Guardian)
Election results, 1974 – 2001  (Keele University)
Politics Resources (Election results from 1922 onwards)
Electoral Calculus (Election results from 1955 onwards)
2017 Election House of Commons Library 2017 Election report
A Vision Of Britain Through Time (Constituency elector numbers)

Parliamentary constituencies in South Wales
Constituencies of the Parliament of the United Kingdom established in 1885
Constituencies of the Parliament of the United Kingdom disestablished in 1918
Constituencies of the Parliament of the United Kingdom established in 1974
Politics of Rhondda Cynon Taf
Mid Glamorgan